Tang Tsz Kwan (born 21 November 1998 in Hong Kong) is a Hong Kong professional footballer who currently plays as a forward for Hong Kong Premier League club Sham Shui Po.

Club career

St. Joseph's
In the 2017–18 season, Tang was the top scorer in the league with 25 goals when he played for St. Joseph's in the Hong Kong Third Division.

Dreams FC
Tang started his professional career with Dreams FC in the Hong Kong Premier League, where he made two appearances.

Yuen Long
After Dreams FC's self-relegation, he played for Yuen Long in the 2019–20 season.

Rangers
On 10 September 2020, Rangers' Director of Football Philip Lee declared that Tang would join the club.

Sham Shui Po
On 8 August 2022, Tang joined Sham Shui Po.

References

External links
 
 Tang Tsz Kwan at HKFA

1998 births
Living people
Hong Kong people
Hong Kong footballers
Hong Kong Premier League players
Dreams Sports Club players
Yuen Long FC players
Hong Kong Rangers FC players
Sham Shui Po SA players
Association football forwards